The Cumming Baronetcy was a title in the Baronetage of Nova Scotia. It was created for Sir Alexander Cumming, 1st Baronet on 28 February 1695.

Cumming baronets of Culter, Scotland (1695)
 Sir Alexander Cumming, 1st Baronet (c.1670–1725) 					
 Sir Alexander Cumming, 2nd Baronet (1690–1775)		
 Sir Alexander Cumming, 3rd Baronet (c.1737–c.1793)

References

External links
 The Scottish Nation : Cumming

Baronetcies in the Baronetage of Nova Scotia